Aminetou Mint El-Moctar (born 13 December 1956) is a Mauritanian politician and women's rights activist. She was shortlisted for the Nobel Peace Prize in 2015 and is the first Mauritanian woman to be considered for the award.

Early life 
El-Moctar was born in Nouakchott on 13 December 1956 and grew up in an upper-class family of eight children. At the age of eleven, her father arranged marriage for her, which she strongly objected to, however the marriage went ahead and her first child was born when she was 14.

As a teenager she was involved with Marxist protests and was arrested several times by police. At this point, she also stood up for the rights of her family's slaves, encouraging them to take their own freedom and to leave. After leaving her husband, and unable to attend school, she worked in a variety of low-paid jobs, including: cigarette seller, switchboard operator, and as a social worker.

Activism & Feminism 
El-Moctar's activism was formed early - standing up for the rights of others from a young age. Activism, speaking out against the government, especially by women, is unpopular with the authorities in Mauritania. IN 1974 she set up the  Association of Mauritanian Women Democrats. Between 1989 and 1991 she was a member of The International Democratic Movement to Defend the Oppressed. In 1991 El-Moctar was arrested and tortured because she spoke out against the massacre of black minority Mauritanians in Nouadhibou. Her involvement led to the creation of the Committee on Solidarity with the Victims of Repression in Mauritania. She has lobbied for a quota in government for the involvement of women in political decision-making - it stands at 20% in 2019.

In 2009 she spearheaded protests against the sex trafficking of young women to the Arabian Peninsula. She has spoken out against the early marriage of girls and especially the cultural practice of force-feeding young women to become fat ready for marriage, leading to obesity and diabetes. In order to further the cause of human rights she states that: "We need to continue to raise taboo issues in order to break them, to make people aware of their rights and duties and, above all, to denounce all inhuman, degrading and discriminatory practices towards people, especially women and children". El-Moctar considers herself a feminist and wants to encourage women from across Africa to come together in the fights against male domination.

Fatwa 
In 2014, a fatwa was launched against her by the imam of a Mauritanian radical Islamist movement, who call themselves Ahbab Errassoul (The Prophet's Friends). The order was issued against El-Moctar because she publicly defending a blogger who was accused by Ahbab Errassoul of apostasy. The fatwa called for the killing and gouging out of El-Moctar's eye, simply because she demanded a fair trial for the blogger.

The Association of Women Heads of Households 

On 17 April 1999, El-Moctar founded The Association of Women Heads of Households (AFCF), which she chairs. From its outset, the AFCF has been designed to reflect the diversity of Mauritania, including Arab, Berber, Haratin, Pulaar, Soninke and Wolof women. The AFCF has  12,000 members, six rescue centres for victims, 168 social workers, four lawyers and a contact person in every city in Mauritania. In 2019, the AFCF proposed new legislation to the Mauritanian government to defend women rights, in particular to introduce harsher sentences for rape. The proposal was rejected by the Mauritanian government as it did not comply with Sharia law.

Awards and honours 
El-Moctar was awarded the Human Rights Prize of the French Republic in 2006. In 2010 she was awarded the Legion d'Honneur for her work in defending human rights in Mauritania.

Other recognition includes: 
 Heroes Prize (USA)
 500 Most Influential Personalities in the Muslim World
 Prize from the Young Chamber of Commerce of Mauritania

References

External links 

Speaking to Unicef on YouTube

Mauritanian Muslims
21st-century Mauritanian women politicians
21st-century Mauritanian politicians
Mauritanian women's rights activists
Mauritanian women activists
Living people
Abolitionists
African feminists
Mauritanian human rights activists
1956 births
People from Nouakchott